"Hell Breaks Loose" is a hip-hop song by American rapper Eminem, featured on his 2009 album Relapse: Refill the re-release of Relapse. "Hell Breaks Loose" was a promotional single released on December 15, releasing the same day as "Elevator". The song features Dr. Dre, who also produced the song with Mark Batson. On the week ending January 2, 2010, "Hell Breaks Loose" debuted at #29 on the Billboard Hot 100, as the week's Hot Shot Debut.

Track listing

Charts

References

2009 singles
Eminem songs
Dr. Dre songs
Songs written by Eminem
Songs written by Dr. Dre
Songs written by Mark Batson
Song recordings produced by Dr. Dre
Shady Records singles
Aftermath Entertainment singles
Interscope Records singles
Hardcore hip hop songs
Horrorcore songs
Song recordings produced by Mark Batson
2009 songs
Songs written by Mike Elizondo
Songs written by Dawaun Parker